Trembleuse or tasse trembleuse also gobelet et soucoupe enfoncé, is a drinking cup and saucer with the saucer given a raised holding area in which the cup sits more securely than in the normal style.  Often the well in the saucer is in openwork, as in the Vienna example illustrated. Then it is called a Mancerina

It was designed to allow people with a weak grip or a medical condition involving shaking or trembling hands to drink a beverage, initially tea or hot chocolate. The cup sits in a saucer with either a well, or a raised rim to prevent the liquid from spilling. Cups were designed with or without handles, and optionally a lid.  They were normally sold singly, rather than in sets.

Such saucers had been common in Chinese ceramics for centuries.  In Europe they originated in Paris in the 1690s.  Sèvres used the term Gobelet et soucoupe enfoncé for a saucer with a well in catalogues from 1759.  Many of the most famous porcelain manufacturers, such as Sèvres,  Meissen, and Vienna produced trembleuses.

See also
 Pedro de Toledo, 1st Marquis of Mancera

References

External links 

Drinkware
Teaware
Porcelain